Emilie Luise Friderica Mayer (14 May 1812, Friedland, Mecklenburg-Vorpommern – 10 April 1883, Berlin) was a German composer of Romantic music. Although Emilie Mayer began her serious compositional study relatively late in life, she was a very prolific composer, eventually producing some 8 symphonies and at least 15 concert overtures, as well as  numerous chamber works and lieder.

Life and career
Emilie Mayer was the third of five children and eldest daughter of wealthy pharmacist, Johann August Friedrich Mayer, and wife Henrietta Carolina. Her mother died when Emelie was two years old. When she was five, she received a grand piano and was given music lessons. Seemingly destined for a domestic life, at the age of 28 her circumstances changed when her father committed suicide, leaving Mayer with a large inheritance.

In 1841, she moved to the regional capital city of Stettin (now Szczecin, Poland) and sought to study composition with Carl Loewe, a central figure in the musical life of the city. The German writer Marie Silling claims that Loewe, after auditoning her, claimed  "You actually know nothing and everything at the same time! I shall be the gardener who grows your talent from a bud to a beautiful flower"

In 1847, after the premiere of her first two symphonies (C minor and E minor) by the Stettin Instrumental Society, and with the urging of her tutor, she moved to Berlin to continue her compositional studies.  Once in Berlin, she studied fugue and double counterpoint with Adolph Bernhard Marx, and instrumentation with Wilhelm Wieprecht.

She began publishing her works (e.g. Lieder and Chants, op. 5-7, in 1848) and performing in private concerts. Then, on 21 April 1850, Wieprecht led his "Euterpe" orchestra in a concert at the Royal Theatre exclusively presenting compositions by Mayer, including a concert overture, string quartet, a setting of Psalm 118 for chorus and orchestra, two symphonies and some piano solos. Shortly after this, she was awarded the gold medal of art from the Queen of Prussia, Elisabeth Ludovika of Bavaria. With critical and popular acclaim, she continued composing works for public performance. She traveled to attend performances of her works, including to Cologne, Munich, Lyon, Brussels and Vienna. As Mayer's instrumental works were being increasingly performed and her fame grew, she was appointed co-director of the Berlin Opera. Even so, she was often forced to meet the costs involved herself. While her male counterparts would often receive an honorarium from their publishers, Mayer still had to pay for publication of her works.

After Carl Loewe died in 1869 the Loewe society was formed. Mayer dedicated two of her cello sonatas to members of the society and their families. Her Op. 47 is dedicated to the Baron von Seckendorff from Stargard, and her Op. 40 is dedicated to the sister of composer  from Kolberg.

In 1876, Mayer returned to Berlin where her music was still frequently performed. Mayer’s new Faust Overture was successful and she re-established herself as a significant figure in the city’s cultural circles. She died on 10 April 1883 in Berlin and was buried at the Dreifaltigkeitsfriedhof I at the Holy Trinity Church not far from  Felix and Fanny Mendelssohn.

Compositional style
Emilie Mayer was initially influenced by the Vienna classic style, whilst her later works were more Romantic. Mayer's harmonies are characterized by sudden shifts in tonality and the frequent use of seventh chords, with the diminished seventh allowing Mayer to reach a variety of resolutions. One defining characteristic of Mayer's music is a tendency to set up a tonal centre with a dominant seventh, but not resolving to the tonic immediately; sometimes, resolution is skipped altogether. Her rhythms are often very complex, with several layers interacting at once. The first movements of her works usually follow a sonata-allegro form.

Compositions

Mayer's chamber music output was extensive, including many works for piano and seven string quartets. She wrote a piano concerto, fifteen overtures and eight symphonies, as well as an opera.

Discography
Fanny Mendelssohn-Hensel, Emilie Mayer, M. Laura Lombardini Sirmen: String Quartets (CPO, 2000). String Quartet in G minor, op. 14. Performed by: Erato Quartett Basel.
Fanny Hensel, Emilie Mayer, Luise Adolpha LeBeau (Dreyer Gaido, 2003). Symphony No. 5 in F minor. Performed by: Kammersymphonie Berlin, Jürgen Bruns (conductor).
Mayer: Violin Sonatas (Feminae Records, 2012): Sonata in E minor for Violin and Piano, op. 19 – Sonata in E-flat Major for Violin and Piano – Sonata in A minor for Violin and Piano, op. 18. Performed by: Aleksandra Maslovaric (violin), Anne-Lise Longuemare (piano).
Emilie Mayer (Capriccio, 2018). Symphony no. 4 in B minor – Piano Concerto in B flat major – String Quartet in G minor – Piano Sonata in D minor – Tonwellen. Valse – Maricia in A major. Performed by: Ewa Lupiec, Yang Tai (piano), Klenke Quartett, Neubrandenburger Philharmonie, Stefan Malzew, Sebastian Tewinkel (conductors).
Emilie Mayer (CPO, 2020). Symphony No. 1 in C minor - Symphony No. 2 in E minor. Performed by NDR Radiophilharmonie conducted by Leo McFall.
Emile Mayer (Hänssler Classic, 2021). Symphony No. 3 in C major - Symphony No. 6 in E major. Performed by Philharmonisches Orchester Bremerhaven, conducted by Marc Niemann.
Emilie Mayer: Piano Trios, Notturno (CPO, 2017): Piano Trios, Op. 13 and 16; Notturno for Violin & Piano, Op. 48. Performed by: Trio Vivente.
BBC Radio 3 broadcast five hours of Mayer's music from 29 November to 3 December 2021 as Composer of the Week. These are available as downloads on BBC Sounds and as podcasts.

Sources
 Martha Furman Schleifer, Linda Plaut: “Emilie Mayer (1812–1883)“. In: Women Composers. Music through the Ages. Volume 8, Composers born 1800–1899: Large and Small Instrumental Ensembles, ed. by Sylvia Glickman (= Women Composers 8). Detroit, Mich.  2006, 131–136.
 Eva Rieger: “Emilie Mayer”. In: The New Grove Dictionary of Woman Composers'', ed. by Julie Anne Sadie and Rhian Samuel, London 1994, 321.

Notes

References

External links
Biography (in German)

 Free digital scores by Emilie Mayer in the OpenScore Lieder Corpus
Music Festival in Mecklenburg-Vorpommern
Concert tour through Mecklenburg-Western Pomerania with the Cornelis Quartet, 2017 - Beethoven Quartet op.18 No. 1, F major and Mayer's quartets in g minor and e minor

1812 births
1883 deaths
19th-century classical composers
19th-century German composers
German classical composers
German women classical composers
German Romantic composers
Musicians from Berlin
Pupils of Adolf Bernhard Marx
People from Friedland, Mecklenburg-Vorpommern
19th-century women composers
String quartet composers